ANSI Z535 is an American standard that sets forth a system for presenting safety and accident prevention information.  It corresponds to the international ISO 3864 standard.

Sub-Standards
The ANSI Z535 standard comprises the following six individual standards:

 ANSI Z535.1 American National Standard for Safety Colors
 ANSI Z535.2 American National Standard for Environmental and Facility Safety Signs
 ANSI Z535.3 American National Standard for Criteria for Safety Symbols
 ANSI Z535.4 American National Standard for Product Safety Signs and Labels
 ANSI Z535.5 American National Standard for Safety Tags and Barricade Tapes (for Temporary Hazards)
 ANSI Z535.6 American National Standard for Product Safety Information in Product Manuals, Instructions (technical writing), and Other Collateral Materials

Regulation

ANSI and the Occupational Safety and Health Administration (OSHA) work side-by-side to manage Hazardous Communications (HazCom) in all American workplaces and in conjunction with the International Organization for Standardization (ISO) for international HazCom. While ANSI manages HazCom design and application standards, OSHA sets federal laws and provides states and local governments with standards they use to establish laws and regulate codes within their own jurisdictions. The Occupational Safety and Health (OSH) Act of 1970 is one of the most important of all HazCom federal laws because it clearly states the employer's legal responsibility: "Each employer shall furnish to each of his employees' employment and a place of employment which are free from recognized hazards that are causing or are likely to cause death or serious physical harm to his employees." 

Shortly after the OSH Act of 1970 was passed into law, OSHA updated its HazCom standards with the passage of OSHA Standard 1910.145. This standard was one of the first to clarify design, application and use of HazCom signs and symbols. These newer standards also helped define specific hazards that could harm workers, the public, or both and/or cause damage to property. OSHA Standard 1910.145 covers all safety signs except those designed for streets, highways and railroads.  
  
With the passage of OSHA Standard 1910.145, the administration also began referencing ANSI HazCom design and application standards instead of creating its own (see example below):
"Fundamental Specification of Safety Colors for CIE Standard Source 'C,' " of ANSI Z53.1-1967 or in Table 1, "Specification of the Safety Colors for CIE Illuminate C and the CIE 1931, 2° Standard Observer," of ANSI Z535.1-2006(R2011), incorporated by reference in § 1910.6."

Today, ANSI Z53.1-1967 and ANSI Z53.1-1968 are known as ANSI Z535.1, Z535.2, Z535.3, Z535.4, Z535.5 and Z535.6. These standards (books) offer more specific HazCom guidance for employers designing workplaces, manufacturers providing products to the workplace, as well as employers documenting workplace procedures, and manufacturers documenting product manuals. ANSI's Z535 signal words and associated design standards are crafted to interface seamlessly with the International Organization for Standardization (ISO) - making ANSI's DANGER, WARNING, CAUTION and NOTICE standards the most widely used and accepted in the world. However, these newer ANSI standards are not yet referenced by OSHA and not legally binding. According to OSHA, the newer ANSI standards will fulfill OSHA's HazCom requirements when substituted in place of the older ANSI Z53.1-1967 and ANSI Z53.1-1968.

"OSHA will continue to reference the ANSI Z35.1-68 and ANSI Z53.1-67 standards when enforcing workplace safety. Employers are allowed, however, to comply with the most current consensus standards applicable to their operations, rather than with the OSHA standard in effect at the time of inspection, when the employer's action provides equal or greater employee protection. So long as the standards used by the employer provide such protection, a violation where the employer is not in compliance with OSHA's standards but is in compliance with the new standards may be considered de minimis and not be cited."

Although OSHA does not legally require or reference ANSI's newest HazCom standards, proper use of the latest ANSI Z535 standards offers employers and manufacturers many advantages.
 ANSI Z535 is a legal substitute for the older ANSI standards OSHA does require, 
 ANSI Z535's safety signal words and related designs are the most globally accepted HazCom and generally preferred globally over ISO alternatives, 
 ANSI Z535 offers the greatest level of protection against HazCom liability suits,
 OSHA relies, exclusively, on ANSI to establish all new HazCom design standards for the administration's own standards and federal regulations.

In a 2013 public letter to NEMA/ANSI, OSHA says it is actively working to incorporate ANSI's latest Z535 standards into its HazCom design references.

Development
The ANSI Z535 standards are administered and published by NEMA the National Electrical Manufacturers Association, an association of member companies that manufacture a diverse set of products including power transmission and distribution equipment, lighting systems, factory automation and control systems, and medical diagnostic imaging systems. NEMA is headquartered in Arlington, Virginia.

These standards have been developed and formulated by the ANSI Z535 committee, originally formed in 1979 and accredited by the American National Standards Institute. This committee is a highly active United States standards-making body that writes these standards to govern the characteristics of visual safety markings that are used to warn about hazards and prevent accidents. 

As of 2020, the chair of the committee is Steven M. Hall, Senior Consultant, Applied Safety + Ergonomics in Ann Arbor, Michigan.  Previously, the chairmanship was held by Geoffrey Peckham, CEO of Clarion Safety Systems from 2012 to 2020, succeeding Gary Bell who held the chair for more than two decades. 

The ANSI Z535 standard series is continually improved and refined based on human factors, research, and court case precedents. These standards are formally revised every five years, with the most recent publication in October 2017.

Usage

ANSI Z535-style communications are becoming more prevalent in society. Identified by their use of the signal words "DANGER", "WARNING", "CAUTION", "NOTICE", or "SAFETY INSTRUCTIONS", ANSI-style signs most often include specific details about the nature of the hazard, the consequence of interaction with the hazard, and avoidance procedures. Product manufacturers and facility owners in a wide array of industries use the ANSI Z535 standards in their efforts to assure a safer workplace and the safe use of their products so both accidents and lawsuits are minimized.
 
Safety colors provided by ANSI Z535 are harmonized with U.S. Federal Regulations, and include tolerances ranges to make them compatible with ISO 3864.   However, ANSI safety colors are not exactly the same colors as used in U.S. traffic signs (prescribed by the MUTCD.)

The ANSI Z535 standards are often cited in U.S. court decisions as the state-of-the-art benchmark against which safety markings and their adequacy are judged.

See also
ISO 3864 — International equivalent to this American National Standard, for information signs, colors and warnings
ISO 7010 — International equivalent to this American National Standard, for shapes and symbols

References

External links
 

American National Standards Institute standards
Safety codes
NEMA standards
Electrical safety